Chris Ward (born December 11, 1978) is an American professional surfer. As of 2014 he was competing in the qualification series for the ASP World Tour.

Ward began his elite tour campaign in 2005. The 2009 season is his 5th season on tour. His highest ASP World Tour rating was 11th in 2006.

As of 2009 his total career earnings are $397,500.00.

Rating history on the ASP World Tour 
2008: 14th
2007: 17th
2006: 21st
2005: 34th

References
ASP World Tour page

American surfers
1978 births
Living people
Sportspeople from Galveston, Texas
People from San Clemente, California